Temple of Bellona may refer to:

Temple of Bellona, Rome
Temple of Bellona, Ostia